Chan Chich Airstrip  is an airport serving the Chan Chich Lodge and the Gallon Jug Estate in the Orange Walk District of Belize.

Lodge access
The airport is the preferred means of access to the eco-lodge created by Sir Barry Bowen in the private  game park deep in the Belize rain forest, adjacent to the Rio Bravo Conservation area. Arduous tracks accessible by 4WD vehicles are the only other connections from less remote areas. Because driving to Chan Chich requires passing through private lands, access permits must be granted in advance.

The airstrip also serves the wider Gallon Jug community, including the ranch, where efforts are being made to breed a strain of cattle more suited to the tropics by cross-breeding with English Hereford bloodlines.

The lodge has been serving tourists since 1988. A Mayan archeological site is near the lodge.

See also

Transport in Belize
List of airports in Belize

References

External links
OpenStreetMap - Gallon Jug
OurAirports - Chan Chich Airstrip
Aerodromes in Belize - pdf

Airports in Belize
Orange Walk District